Creative Orchestra Music 1976 is an album by American jazz saxophonist and composer Anthony Braxton recorded in 1976 and released on the Arista label. The album was subsequently included on The Complete Arista Recordings of Anthony Braxton released by Mosaic Records in 2008.

Reception
The AllMusic review by Scott Yanow awarded the album 4 stars, stating that "this is one of Braxton's most interesting recordings... There are quite a few memorable moments on this program."

Track listing
All compositions by Anthony Braxton
 "Piece 1" - 5:12 
 "Piece 2" - 7:37 
 "Piece 3" - 6:45 
 "Piece 4" - 6:28 
 "Piece 5" - 7:21 
 "Piece 6" - 6:40 
Recorded at Generation Sound Studios in New York in February 1976

The original titles of the pieces were cryptic diagrams with letters and numbers.

Personnel
Anthony Braxton - sopranino saxophone, alto saxophone, contrabass saxophone, clarinet, contrabass clarinet, flute
Roscoe Mitchell - flute, soprano saxophone, alto saxophone, bass saxophone
Seldon Powell - alto saxophone, clarinet, flute
Ronald Bridgewater - clarinet, tenor saxophone 
Bruce Johnstone - bass clarinet, baritone saxophone 
Leo Smith - trumpet (tracks 2-5), conductor (tracks 1, 3 & 5)  
Cecil Bridgewater, Kenny Wheeler - trumpet
Jon Faddis - trumpet, piccolo trumpet
Garrett List, George E. Lewis - trombone 
Earl McIntyre, Jack Jeffers - bass trombone
Jonathan Dorn - tuba 
Muhal Richard Abrams - piano (tracks 1, 2, 4 & 5), conductor (track 6)
Frederic Rzewski - piano, bass drum 
Richard Teitelbaum - synthesizer  
Karl Berger - glockenspiel, vibraphone, xylophone, chimes 
Dave Holland - bass, cello 
Barry Altschul - snare drum, bells, chimes, gong, percussion  
Philip Wilson - cymbal, percussion  
Warren Smith - drums, tympani

References

Arista Records albums
Anthony Braxton albums
1976 albums
Albums produced by Michael Cuscuna